Jerry Don Gleaton (born September 14, 1957) is an American former professional baseball pitcher who played from 1979 to 1992 for the Texas Rangers, Seattle Mariners, Chicago White Sox, Kansas City Royals, Detroit Tigers, and Pittsburgh Pirates of  Major League Baseball (MLB). He was an All-American at the University of Texas and the Most Valuable Player of the Southwest Conference in 1979. Gleaton was drafted by the Texas Rangers in the first round (18th pick overall), and was a southpaw pitcher who worked mainly in relief. He was traded along with Richie Zisk,  Rick Auerbach, Ken Clay, Brian Allard and minor-league right-handed pitcher Steve Finch from the Rangers to the Mariners for Willie Horton, Rick Honeycutt, Leon Roberts, Mario Mendoza and Larry Cox in an 11-player blockbuster deal on December 18, 1980. 

He is active in the Pro Athletes Outreach ministry and resides in Brownwood, Texas. He is currently an assistant coach for the Howard Payne University Yellow Jackets (Division 3).

References

External links

1957 births
Living people
All-American college baseball players
American expatriate baseball players in Canada
Baseball coaches from Texas
Baseball players from Texas
Buffalo Bisons (minor league) players
Chicago White Sox players
Detroit Tigers players
Detroit Tigers scouts
Edmonton Trappers players
Howard Payne Yellow Jackets baseball coaches
Kansas City Royals players
Lynn Sailors players
Omaha Royals players
People from Brownwood, Texas
Phoenix Firebirds players
Pittsburgh Pirates players
Salt Lake City Gulls players
Seattle Mariners players
Spokane Indians players
Texas Longhorns baseball players
Texas Rangers players
Tulsa Drillers players